Andrea Commodi (1560–1638) was an Italian painter of the early-Baroque period. Born in Florence, but mostly active in Rome, he was a pupil of the painter Cigoli. He painted frescoes in the sacristy of San Carlo ai Catinari and a Fall of the Angels now in the Accademia gallery in Florence. One of his pupils was a juvenile Pietro da Cortona who moved to Rome and became one of the towering figures of the Italian Baroque. Another pupil was Giovanni Battista Stefaneschi (1582–1659).

References

1560 births
1638 deaths
16th-century Italian painters
Italian male painters
Painters from Florence
Renaissance painters
Fresco painters